Lundsford Moody (born July 30, 1929) was an American politician. He was a member of the Georgia House of Representatives , first elected in 1978. He is a member of the Democratic party.

Personal Life

Moody is survived by his two sons, nephews Jim Collins and Jay Hamilton (both Georgia lobbyists), and great niece, Grace Lauren Hamilton.

References

Living people
Democratic Party members of the Georgia House of Representatives
1929 births
People from Appling County, Georgia
20th-century American politicians